Groove Collective is an American band. In 2007 they were nominated for a Grammy Award for Best Contemporary Jazz Album of the Year for the release People People Music Music on the Savoy Jazz label.

Style
Groove Collective was formed in 1990.  The original members were percussionist/MC Gordon "Nappy G" Clay, keyboardist Itaal Shur, Vibraphonist Bill Ware, drummer Genji Siraisi, bassist Jonathan Maron, percussionist Chris Theberge, flutist Richard Worth, saxophonist Jay Rodriguez, trumpeter Fabio Morgera, trombonist Josh Roseman.

After witnessing an early show, producer Gary Katz negotiated the band's signing to Reprise Records, and produced their eponymous debut album in 1993.

In 1994, they appeared on the Red Hot Organization's compilation album, Stolen Moments: Red Hot + Cool, alongside other prominent jazz artists, Herbie Hancock and Roy Ayers.  The album, meant to raise awareness and funds in support of the AIDS epidemic in relation to the African American community, was heralded as "Album of the Year" by Time magazine.

They scored two instrumental and adult contemporary hits in 1996 with a cover of the Beatles' "I Want You (She's So Heavy)" (US Dance/Club Play #45, US Dance Maxi Singles #23) and "Lift Off" (US R&B/Hip-Hop #73).

Groove Collective's musical style reflects the wide-ranging backgrounds and interests of its individual members. Commenting on the group's 1996 release, We the People, critic Michael Casey referred to the numerous influences at work in Groove Collective's sound, specifically the presence of Afro-pop, Latin jazz, hip-hop, and traditional jazz stylings. This mix is born of the members' varying influences, including bebop, funk, old-school hip-hop and classic soul. Bassist and co-founder Jonathan Maron has acknowledged the importance of a DJ aesthetic in the music, stating that "(Groove Collective's) goal has always been to emulate the range of music a DJ plays during the course of the night at a packed club. ... A great DJ knows the songs that can ignite the room and fill the dance floor. Some of my favorite musical experiences have been in clubs, where you listen and realize how well all of these styles blend together into one big idiom of its own." Central to the group's ethic is its insistence on live instrumentation and its ability to create and sustain grooves for a dance floor audience.

Groove Collective is one of three known live bands to have played at David Mancuso's famed Loft parties.

Members of Groove Collective have worked with Prince, Tupac Shakur, the Sugar Hill Gang, D’Angelo, The Jazz Passengers, Dave Holland, Steely Dan, Curtis Mayfield, John Zorn, The Skatalites, Pharoah Sanders, Celia Cruz, Meshell Ndegeocello among others.

Discography
 Groove Collective (Reprise/Giant Step, 1994) U.S. Jazz No. 20
 We the People (Giant Step, 1996) U.S. Jazz No. 20
 Dance of the Drunken Master (Shanachie, 1998) U.S. Jazz No. 22
 Declassified (Shanachie, 1999)
 It's All in Your Mind (Shanachie, 2001)
 Live: Brooklyn, NY 04.20.02 (Kufala, 2002)
 Live...and Hard to Find (Kufala, 2002)
 New York, NY 20.12.02 (Kufala, 2002)
 People People Music Music (Savoy, 2005)
 PS1 Warm Up: Brooklyn, NY, 7/2/2005 (Kufala, 2007)

Current lineup
 Jay Rodriguez – saxophone, flute, vocals
 Jonathan Maron – bass
 Genji Siraisi – drums
 Chris Ifatoye Theberge – Conga, Bata
with
 Josh Roseman – trombone
 Marcio Garcia - keyboards
 Bryan Vargas - guitar
 Nina Creese - percussion and vocals

Past members
 Richard Worth – flute, kalimba, compositions, vocals
 Itaal Shur – keyboards, synthesizers, compositions, vocals
 Bill Ware – vibraphone, compositions, vocals
 Nappy G/Gordon Clay – percussion, talking drum, compositions, vocals
 Barney McAll - Keyboards, toys, samples, compositions
 Fabio Morgera- trumpet and flugelhorn, compositions
 David Jensen – tenor saxophone
 Mike Dillon (musician) - vibraphone

Collaborators
 Adam Rogers - guitar
 Mark Anthony Jones - guitar
Bryan Vargas - guitar
-
 Uli Geissendorfer - keyboards
 Jonathan Crayford - keyboards
 Etienne "ATN" Stadjwyck - keyboards
Bernie Worrell - keyboards
Victor Axlerod - keyboards
Eric Lane - keyboards
Ben Stivers - keyboards
Pablo Vegera - keyboards
Cucho Valdez
-
 Curtis Fowlkes - trombone
Fred Wesley - trombone
 Reut Regev - trombone
 Peter Apfelbaum - saxophones
Troy Simms - saxophones
Clark Gayton - trombone
Jack Walrath - trumpet
-
 DJ Jazzy Nice - DJ
 Wayne "Smash" Hunter - DJ
DJ Nicodemus
Eric Kupper
Salam Remi
-
 Diosa Gary - vocals
 MC Babee Power - vocals
 Vinia Mojica - vocals
 Alien Nation - vocals
 Lucy Woodward - vocals
Malik Work - vocals
-
 Hiroyuki Sanada - production and mixology
 Uncle Fester - live production

References

American funk musical groups
Musical groups from New York City
American jazz ensembles from New York City